COPY is the debut album by the Japanese electronic artist Mitsuki Aira. It was released on September 8, 2008 as a CD, in two editions, both containing the singles "Colorful Tokyo Sounds No. 9", "China Discotica" and "Darling Wondering Staring". "Galaxy Boy" was used as the ending theme to Aichi Television's program Bonita! Bonita!! and The Dream Car Club of Tamoei Yakushiji.  The album reached a peak daily position of number 31 on the Oricon chart, and a peak weekly position of number 48 and sold 3,163 copies.

Track listing

Regular volume package edition

Limited special price edition 
A limited release of the album was produced for a lower price, only containing tracks one through twelve.

Bonus discs 
Two external CDs were given away with purchases of either edition of the album for a limited time at certain Tower Records and HMV. Tower Records distributed a bonus disc containing a "Yakenohara Megamix" while HMV distributed a bonus disc containing "L0ne1yBoy L0ne1yGirl", which was later included as a coupling track on the HMV exclusive single, Valentine Step.

References 

2008 debut albums
Aira Mitsuki albums